Ariston was a painter of Ancient Greece. He was the son and pupil of Aristeides of Thebes. He is known to have painted a satyr holding a goblet and crowned with a garland. Antorides and Euphranor were his disciples.

Notes

Ancient Greek painters
4th-century BC Greek people
Year of birth unknown
Place of birth unknown
Year of death unknown
Place of death unknown
4th-century BC painters